Haplogroup H10e is a human mitochondrial DNA haplogroup. It is defined by mutation C16221T.  It is between 5,700 and 7,000 years old.

Origins 
According to Behar et al., the woman who founded this line was estimated to have lived between 2,400 and 7,000 years ago. From a neolithic burial at the Bom Santo cave (near Lisbon/Portugal), however, we know that H10e existed already at 3735 BCE ± 45 years. Hence H10e is at least 5,753 years old.

Almost a thousand years later an H10e find was associated with a Corded Ware Culture burial in Eulau. The site Eulau, Burgenlandkreis, is located in the valley of the Saale river in Germany. What is interesting to note in this context, is that H10e was first found at the Bom Santo cave which is located near the epicenter of the birth of the Bell Beaker culture. Then the find at Eulau was geographically located at the boundary between the Bell Beaker area of influence and the Corded Ware Culture area of influence. Therefore we may see evidence that some women of Bell Beaker ethnic origin became part of the Corded Ware Culture.

Descendant branches 
Haplogroup H10e has currently three descendent branches, namely H10e1, H10e2 and H10e3.

Archeological record 
Haplogroup H10e has been found at a neolithic site, namely the Bom Santo cave near Lisbon, Portugal. This is the oldest sample of H10 which has ever been found and it has been dated to 3735 BCE (+- 45 years). Out of 14 individuals analyzed there was only a single sample belonging to haplogroup H, namely a migrant male belonging to haplogroup H10e.

In 2008 mitochondrial DNA was extracted from a gravesite in Eulau (2,600 BCE) which has been associated with the Corded Ware Culture. Haplogroup H10e was found in one individual out of nine tested.

Furthermore, H10e has been found in a 10th century sample from a male individual buried at the Zvonimirovo cemetery site in Croatia.

There is also a strong Viking component with this haplogroup. The following samples from Scandianavia of the Viking age have all been associated with H10e:

H10e has been found twice at the medieval Tuukkala archeological site in Finland. The Tuukkala site is located in north eastern Finland and has been dated to 1200 AD - 1400 AD. Two individuals (TU631 and TU645) both shared the same H10e-haplotype.

Prominent members of H10e 
Pierre Terrail (1473 – 30 April 1524), seigneur de Bayard, the legendary medieval French knight "without fear and beyond reproach", is thought to have carried mtDNA haplogroup H10e. This has been determined by DNA-testing both his exhumed remains and DNA-matching with living relatives on the maternal line.

Marguerite de Baugé, dame de Mirabel (1200–1252), is an ancestor of Pierre Terrail and the presently oldest known member of H10e with an unbroken genealogical tree on the maternal line up the present.

References 

Human mtDNA haplogroups